Shyampur Sugar Mills a Bangladesh sugar mill.  It was started in 1967 by the Pakistani government.  At that time East Pakistan had only 5 sugar mills. It is situated at Shyampur under Badarganj Upazila, 16 kilometers west of Rangpur City. Shyampur Sugar Mills falls under the Bangladesh Sugar and Food Industries Corporation. The mill has over 1400 workers. The livelihood of the people of the region depends totally upon this industry.

References 

Sugar mills in Bangladesh
Government-owned companies of Bangladesh